Bishapur (Middle Persian: Bay-Šāpūr; , Bishâpûr) was an ancient city in Sasanid Persia (Iran) on the ancient road between Persis and Elam. The road linked the Sassanid capitals Estakhr (very close to Persepolis) and Ctesiphon. It is located south of modern Faliyan in the Kazerun County of Pars Province, Iran.

Bishapur was built near a river crossing and at the same site there is also a fort with rock-cut reservoirs and a river valley with six Sassanid rock reliefs.

The most important point about this city, is the combination of Persian and Roman art and architecture that hadn't been seen before Bishapur construction. Before Bishapour was built, almost all the main cities in Persia/Iran had a circular shape like the old city in Firuzabad or Darab.  Bishapour is the first Persian city with vertical and horizontal streets. Also in the city, especially in interior design, we can see tile work that's adapted from Roman Art.

History 
The name Bishapur derives from Bay-Šāpūr, which means Lord Shapur.

According to an inscription, the city itself was founded in 266 AD by Shapur I (241-272), who was the second Sassanid king and inflicted a triple defeat on the Romans, having killed Gordian III, captured Valerian and forced Philip the Arab to surrender. In his native province of Fars, he built a new capital that would measure up to his ambitions: Bishapur, Shapur's City. Outside the city, Shapur decorated the sides of the Bishapur River gorge with huge historical relief commemorating his triple triumph over Rome. One of these reliefs, in a semicircular shape, has rows of registers with files of soldiers and horses, in a deliberate imitation of the narrative scenes on the Trajan column in Rome.

At Bishapur the king also inaugurated the Sassanid imagery of the king's investiture, which would be copied by his successors: the king and the god are face to face, often on horseback, and the god - usually Ahura Mazda - is holding the royal diadem out to the sovereign.

The city was not a completely new settlement: archaeologists have found remains from the Parthian and Elamite ages.

The city remained important until the Arab conquest of Persia the rise of Islam in the second quarter of the 7th century AD. There were still people living there in the 10th century.

The city has a rectangular plan with a grid pattern of regular intra urban streets, resembling Roman city design. This design was never repeated in the architecture of Iran.

Excavations and research

The site was cleared by the Russian-French archaeologist Roman Ghirshman in the 1930s. The British archaeologist Georgina Herrmann has also written a book about the Sasanian rock reliefs in Bishapur which was published in 1980.

Decoration 

The main part of the excavations took place in the royal sector, in the east of the city. A water temple, interpreted as an Anahita temple, was erected near the palace. In the center there is a cross-shaped space with eight large square exedrae decorated with 64 alcoves. The French excavators believed it had been covered with a dome roof, but this reconstruction has been rejected. To the west lies a courtyard decorated with mosaics; to the east, a square iwan used as a reception room. Its walls must have been covered with small stucco ornaments: rows of medallions, bands of foliage, and topped with merlons inherited from Achaemenid architecture. All these decorative techniques were still used after the Islamic conquest of Persia.

The floor was paved with black marble slabs, with a mosaic border. Along the walls runs a narrow band featuring a series of heads and masks, in a frontal or profile view, on a white background. At the top of each alcove there was a picture of women naked under their transparent veils: courtesans, musicians, dancers, women twisting garlands, together with a few richly attired noble ladies.

See also

 Academy of Gundishapur
 Shapur cave
 Roman architecture
 Roman art
 Byzantine art

References

External links

 Bishapur; Photos
 Bishapur, Photos from Iran, Livius.
 City of Bishapur (Video)

Buildings and structures completed in the 3rd century
Architecture in Iran
Roman Empire art
Sasanian cities
Buildings and structures in Fars Province
Former populated places in Iran
Kazerun County
Geography of Fars Province
Tourist attractions in Fars Province
Stone buildings
Shapur I